ODE-CDV (octadecyloxyethyl-cidofovir) is a cidofovir derivative with antiviral activity.

References

Prodrugs
Antiviral drugs
Pyrimidones